Oeceoclades antsingyensis is a terrestrial orchid species in the genus Oeceoclades that is endemic to western Madagascar. It was first described by Günter Gerlach in 1995.

References

antsingyensis
Endemic flora of Madagascar
Plants described in 1995